131 Charles Street is a Federal style townhouse on Charles Street and near Greenwich Street in the West Village neighborhood of Manhattan, New York City. The red brick Federal two-story-over-raised-basement townhouse with a dormer attic was built in 1834 by David Christie, a stone cutter, for about $2,600. The brick is laid in the Flemish bond pattern.

"These residences of the 1820s were almost all builder's, carpenter's, or stonemason's homes, and there were several blocks of them at one time. in 1899 Montgomery Schuyler, the critic, wrote that they were 'the most respectable and artistic pattern of habitation New York has ever known.'" The house was listed April 19, 1966, as a New York City Landmark.

The structure retains all original window frames and lintels (except in the dormers) At least until 1971, when the property was nominated to the National Register of Historic Places, the trim was white and many original interior features of the house remained. Some minor exterior changes were made during the Victorian period. The house was added to the National Register of Historic Places in 1972 for its architecture.

From 1959 to 1968, the photographer Diane Arbus lived in the former stable behind the main house at 131 Charles St. The address of the back house is 131½ Charles St.

See also
List of New York City Designated Landmarks in Manhattan below 14th Street
National Register of Historic Places listings in Manhattan below 14th Street

References

External links

Forgotten NY
New York City Landmarks Preservation Commission report, April 19, 1966

Houses on the National Register of Historic Places in Manhattan
Houses completed in 1834
Federal architecture in New York City
Houses in Manhattan
New York City Designated Landmarks in Manhattan
West Village
Greenwich Village
1834 establishments in New York (state)